, also known as Inaba Masashige and sometimes known as Mino-no-kami, was a Japanese samurai of the Azuchi–Momoyama period through early Edo period. He served the Oda, Toyotomi, and Tokugawa clans, and became a daimyō in the early Edo period.

Masanari was the husband of Kasuga-no-Tsubone, who bore him three sons: Masakatsu, Masasada, and Masatoshi.  For some reason, Masanari divorced her; and she then became wet-nurse to Tokugawa Hidetada's eldest son, though Masanari and Kasuga divorce they still maintain good relationship as husband and wife as parents toward their children  One of Masanari's grandsons, Inaba Masayasu (1640–1684), is primarily remembered as the enigmatic wakadoshiyori assassin of tairō Hotta Masatoshi.

In the Edo period, the Inaba were identified as one of the fudai or insider daimyō clans which were hereditary vassals or allies of the Tokugawa clan, in contrast with the tozama or outsider clans.

Inaba clan branches
The fudai Inaba clan originated in 16th century Mino Province.  They claim descent from Kōno Michitaka (d. 1374), who claimed descent from Emperor Kanmu (736–805).

A cadet branch are descended from Inaba Masanari (+1628), who fought in the armies of  Nobunaga and then Hideyoshi.  This branch of the Inaba was created in 1588.   In 1619, he was granted the han of Itoigawa (25,000 koku) in Echigo Province; then, in 1627, his holding was transferred to Mōka Domain (65,000 koku) in Shimotsuke Province.  His descendants resided successively at Odawara Domain (105,000 koku) in Sagami Province from 1632 through 1685; at Takata Domain in Echigo province from 1685 through 1701; at Sakura Domain in Shimōsa Province from 1701 through 1723.  Masanari's heirs settled at Yodo Domain (115,000 koku) in Yamashiro Province from 1723 through 1868. 

The head of this clan line was ennobled as a "Viscount" in the Meiji period.

Notable descendants
 Inaba Masamichi, 1681–1685—8th Kyoto shoshidai.
 Inaba Masanobu, 1804–1806—34th Kyoto shoshidai.
 Inaba Masakuni, 1863–1864—55th Kyoto shoshidai.

Notes

References
 Appert, Georges and H. Kinoshita. (1888). Ancien Japon. Tokyo: Imprimerie Kokubunsha. OCLC 4429674
 Bodart-Bailey, Beatrice. (1999). Kaempfer's Japan: Tokugawa Culture Observed.  Honolulu:  University of Hawaii Press . ; ;   OCLC 246417677
 Brinkley, Frank and Dairoku Kikuchi. (1915). A History of the Japanese People from the Earliest Times to the End of the Meiji Era.  New York: Encyclopædia Britannica. OCLC 413099
 Hank, Patrick, ed. (2003). Dictionary of American Family Names. New York: Oxford University Press. ; ; ; ;  OCLC 51655476
 Meyer, Eva-Maria. (1999). Japans Kaiserhof in de Edo-Zeit: Unter besonderer Berücksichtigung der Jahre 1846 bis 1867. Münster: Tagenbuch. ;  OCLC 722998498
 Murdock, James. (1903)  A History of Japan. Kobe: Kobe Chronicle. OCLC 64778754
 Papinot, Jacques Edmond Joseph. (1906) Dictionnaire d'histoire et de géographie du japon. Tokyo: Librarie Sansaisha. OCLC 465662682; Nobiliaire du japon (abridged version of 1906 text).

External links
  "Inaba-shi" on Harimaya.com (6 April 2008)

|-

|-

1571 births
1628 deaths
Inaba clan
Karō
Fudai daimyo